Worstead  is a village and civil parish in the English county of Norfolk. The village is served by Worstead railway station on the Bittern Line. For the purposes of local government, the parish falls within the district of North Norfolk.

The civil parish has an area of 10.65 km² and in the 2001 census had a population of 862 in 365 households; the population increased to 922 at the 2011 census.

The hamlets of Bengate, Briggate, Lyngate, and Meeting Hill are located in the northeast of the parish, and Withergate just to the north of the village. Another recognisable settlement is along Station Road in the southwest of the parish, where houses and a food factory (since 2015 operated by Albert Bartlett) are. The North Walsham & Dilham Canal runs along the northeast parish boundary at Briggate.

History
The villages name means 'enclosure place'.

In the Domesday Book of 1086, Worstead is called Wrdesteda and Ordested. King Canute gave the village to the abbots of St. Benet's Abbey on the River Bure in the Norfolk Broads. At the time of the Domesday Book, the village had two churches, one of which is believed to be St Andrew's Church, of which no remains exist.

The village became very prosperous from the twelfth century when weavers from Flanders arrived in the area. They had been encouraged to settle in Norfolk by King Edward III of England who had married a Flemish princess.

Worsted cloth derives its name from this weaving heritage, although it is no longer manufactured in the village and the last weaver, John Cubitt, died in 1882 at the age of 91. The oldest Act of Parliament kept in the House of Lords Record Office is the Taking of Apprentices for Worsteads in the County of Norfolk Act of 1497. Weaving and spinning demonstrations are part of the annual Worstead Festival on the last weekend in July.

The village is covered by a conservation area.

Amenities

As of 2020 the village has a primary school (Worstead Church of England Primary School), a village hall (the Queen Elizabeth Hall) and adjacent recreation ground, a pub with guest accommodation (The White Lady — formerly the New Inn), a Church of England parish church (St Mary the Virgin), and on Thursdays, mobile post office and fish and chips vans set up on the Church Plain.

There is an annual festival which was first held in 1966.

Governance
The parish has a parish council, consisting of 9 members. It meets at the Village Hall.

An electoral ward in the same name exists, for the purpose of electing a councillor to North Norfolk District Council (one of 40). The current councillor is Saul Penfold, with the most recent election in 2019.

Before boundary changes in 2019, this ward stretched north to Suffield. The (pre-2019) ward had a population of 2,384 in 2011. Since 2019 the ward comprises the parishes of Worstead, Westwick, Scottow, Swanton Abbott, and Skeyton.

References

External links

Information from Genuki Norfolk on Worstead
Parish Council

 
Villages in Norfolk
Civil parishes in Norfolk
North Norfolk